The following is a list of Delaware Fightin' Blue Hens men's basketball head coaches. There have been 24 head coaches of the Fightin' Blue Hens in their 118-season history.

Delaware's current head coach is Martin Ingelsby. He was hired as the Fightin' Blue Hens' head coach in May 2016, replacing Monté Ross, who was fired after the 2015–16 season.

References

Delaware

Delaware Fightin' Blue Hens men's basketball coaches